Marking of Weight (Packages Transported by Vessels) Convention, 1929 is  an International Labour Organization Convention.

It was established in 1929:
Having decided upon the adoption of certain proposals with regard to the marking of the weight on heavy packages transported by vessels,...

Ratifications
As of 2013, the treaty has been ratified by 66 states.

External links 
Text.
Ratifications.

International Labour Organization conventions
Treaties concluded in 1929
Treaties entered into force in 1932
Treaties of the People's Republic of Angola
Treaties of Argentina
Treaties of Australia
Treaties of the First Austrian Republic
Treaties of Azerbaijan
Treaties of Bangladesh
Treaties of the Byelorussian Soviet Socialist Republic
Treaties of Belgium
Treaties of Bosnia and Herzegovina
Treaties of the Kingdom of Bulgaria
Treaties of Burundi
Treaties of Canada
Treaties of Chile
Treaties of the Republic of China (1912–1949)
Treaties of Croatia
Treaties of Cuba
Treaties of Czechoslovakia
Treaties of the Czech Republic
Treaties of the Republic of the Congo (Léopoldville)
Treaties of Denmark
Treaties of Estonia
Treaties of Finland
Treaties of the French Third Republic
Treaties of Nazi Germany
Treaties of the Kingdom of Greece
Treaties of Guinea-Bissau
Treaties of Honduras
Treaties of the Kingdom of Hungary (1920–1946)
Treaties of British India
Treaties of Indonesia
Treaties of the Iraqi Republic (1958–1968)
Treaties of the Irish Free State
Treaties of the Kingdom of Italy (1861–1946)
Treaties of the Empire of Japan
Treaties of Kenya
Treaties of Kyrgyzstan
Treaties of Lithuania
Treaties of Luxembourg
Treaties of Montenegro
Treaties of Mexico
Treaties of Morocco
Treaties of Myanmar
Treaties of the Netherlands
Treaties of Nicaragua
Treaties of Norway
Treaties of the Dominion of Pakistan
Treaties of Panama
Treaties of Papua New Guinea
Treaties of Peru
Treaties of the Second Polish Republic
Treaties of the Ditadura Nacional
Treaties of the Kingdom of Romania
Treaties of the Soviet Union
Treaties of Serbia and Montenegro
Treaties of Slovakia
Treaties of Slovenia
Treaties of South Africa
Treaties of the Second Spanish Republic
Treaties of Suriname
Treaties of Sweden
Treaties of Switzerland
Treaties of Tajikistan
Treaties of North Macedonia
Treaties of the Ukrainian Soviet Socialist Republic
Treaties of Uruguay
Treaties of Venezuela
Treaties of Vietnam
Treaties of Yugoslavia
Admiralty law treaties
Treaties extended to the Faroe Islands
1929 in labor relations